Darlinghurst, an electoral district of the Legislative Assembly in the Australian state of New South Wales had two incarnations, from 1904 until 1920 and from 1950 until 1953.


Election results

Elections in the 1950s

1950

1920 - 1950

Elections in the 1910s

1917

1913

1910

Elections in the 1900s

1907

1904

References

New South Wales state electoral results by district